Loiret's 4th constituency is a French legislative constituency in Loiret.

A by-election was held in the constituency in 2018 after the election of Jean-Pierre Door was annulled. Door was re-elected at the by-election.

Deputies

Election results

2022 

 
 
|-
| colspan="8" bgcolor="#E9E9E9"|
|-

2018 by-election

2017

2012

 
 
 
 
|-
| colspan="8" bgcolor="#E9E9E9"|
|-

References

External links 
Results of legislative elections since 1958

4